The Broxbourne Council election, 2007 was held to elect council members of the Broxbourne Borough Council, a local government authority in Hertfordshire, England.

Composition of expiring seats before election

Election results

Results summary 

An election was held in all 13 wards on 3 May 2007.

The Conservative Party gained 1 seat from the British National Party in the Rosedale Ward - this seat was previously lost to the British National Party in the 2003 Local Government Election.

The new make up of the council following this election was:

Conservative 36 seats
Labour 2 seats

The next Local Government Election will be held on 1 May 2008 when seats will be contested in 12 of the 13 wards. (No election in Rosedale Ward)

Ward results

References

2007
2007 English local elections
2000s in Hertfordshire